Hockey Nunavut is the governing body for ice hockey in Nunavut, Canada. It operates under Hockey North, a branch of Hockey Canada.

Arctic Winter Games 
Nunavut participates in both the male and female hockey categories in the Arctic Winter Games.

Typically, Hockey Nunavut send two male teams (bantam and midget) and one female team (junior). For the 2016 Arctic Winter Games in Nuuk, Greenland, only bantam male hockey and junior female hockey will take place. Due to a lack of facilities in Nuuk, these events will be hosted by the city of Iqaluit, Nunavut in March 2016.

Nunavut Challenge Cup Champions 
Junior teams in Nunavut play off for the Nunavut Challenge Cup. The winners earn the right to represent Nunavut in the Maritime-Hockey North Junior C Championship.

Funding from Hockey Nunavut ended for the tournament in 2018.

Maritime-Hockey North Championship 
Kivalliq Canucks were the first-ever Hockey North team to reach the MHNJC final in 2012. After dropping their first two round robin games the Canucks defeated the Hampton Hurricanes and Tignish Aces to earn a spot in the semifinals. With a 3-1 victory over Pownal Red Devils the team advanced to the gold medal game where they came up short losing to Chester Clippers 7-3.

In 2015 the Baffin Blizzard became the first Hockey North team to capture the championship. Baffin went 2-2-0 in the round robin before defeating Western Valley Panthers 3-1 in the semifinal. The Blizzard went on to defeat South Side Lynx in the championship game 6-5.

Notable alumni
Jordin Tootoo - Former NHL player with the Chicago Blackhawks, Nashville Predators, Detroit Red Wings, and the New Jersey Devils.

References

External links 
Hockey North website
Ice hockey governing bodies in Canada
Sport in Nunavut